National Highway 907G, commonly referred to as NH 907G is a national highway in  India. It is a spur road of National Highway 7.  NH-907G traverses the state of Haryana in India.

Route 
NH-907G connects Jagadhri, Jaroda, Budheri, Bherthal, Mahmoodpur, Salempur Banger and Bilaspur in Haryana.

Junctions  
 
  Terminal near Jagadhri.

See also 
 List of National Highways in India
 List of National Highways in India by state

References

External links 

 NH 907G on OpenStreetMap

National highways in India
National Highways in Haryana